Fausto, OL, born Carlos Fausto Bordalo Gomes Dias; 26 November 1948 in Atlantic Ocean, registered in , Trancoso, is a Portuguese composer and singer.

Biography 
Although he was born aboard the ship Pátria when traveling between mainland Portugal and then Portuguese Angola, Fausto Bordalo Dias was registered in Vila Franca das Naves, Trancoso. It was in the former Portuguese overseas province of Angola that he formed his first band, Os Rebeldes. There, to the musicality of his Beira origin, he assimilated African rhythms. At 20, in Lisbon, where he settled in order to continue his studies - he graduated in political and social sciences at the then called Instituto Superior de Ciências Sociais e Política Ultramarina, later renamed to Instituto Superior de Ciências Sociais e Políticas which belongs now to University of Lisbon - he released his first album, Fausto, with which he won the Revelation Award in 1969. Within the associative movement in Lisbon, he got close to names like José Afonso, Adriano Correia de Oliveira, Manuel Freire, together with José Mário Branco or Luís Cília, who were living in exile. During the Portuguese Colonial War he was conscripted to the theatre of military operations in Portuguese Guinea and by refusing to perform military service he became a military absentee. After the Carnation Revolution of 1974, he distanced himself from PREC-inspired protest song and embraced Portuguese traditional music with strong influences from traditional music of Minho, Beira and Trás-os-Montes e Alto Douro regions. On July 8, 1997, he offered one of his most remarkable concerts, celebrating the 500th anniversary of Vasco da Gama's departure to India, on the same day in 1497, at the invitation of the National Commission for the Commemorations of the Portuguese Discoveries. Author of 12 recordings, recorded between 1970 and 2011 (ten originals, one re-recorded compilation and one live record), he is currently an important name in Portuguese music and in popular music in particular. His work has been revisited by names such as, among others, Mafalda Arnauth, Né Ladeiras, Pedro Moutinho, Teresa Salgueiro, Cristina Branco, Marco Oliveira and Ana Moura.

Discography

Studio albums 

 Fausto (1970)
 P'ró Que Der e Vier (1974)
 Beco com saída (1975)
 Madrugada dos Trapeiros (1977)
 Histórias de Viajeiros (1979)
 Por Este Rio Acima (1982)
 O despertar dos alquimistas (1985)
 Para além das cordilheiras (1987)
 A preto e branco (1988)
 Crónicas da terra ardente (1994)
 A Ópera Mágica do Cantor Maldito (2003)
 Em Busca das Montanhas Azuis (2011)

Singles and EPs 

 Fausto (EP) (1969)
 Guerra do Mirandum (1984)

Compilation albums 

 O Melhor dos Melhores (1994)
 Atrás dos Tempos Vêm Tempos (1996)
 Grande Grande É a Viagem (live) (1999)
 18 canções de amor e mais uma de ressentido protesto (2007)

Collaborations 

 Três Cantos  (live) with José Mário Branco and Sérgio Godinho (2009)

Awards 

 9 June 1994 – Order of Liberty
 1988 – José Afonso award

References

External links 

  (pt)
 Fausto on IMDB (en)
 Fausto Bordalo Dias' Discography (en)
 Por favor, leiam estes discos (by Viriato Teles, 2 December 1994) (pt)
 Interview with Fausto Bordalo Dias (from the book Contas à Vida by Viriato Teles, 2005) (pt)
 Dutch fan page about Fausto Bordalo Dias (en)
 O cantor maldito (Unofficial Blog) (pt)
 FAUSTO Bordalo Dias (Unofficial Blog) (pt)

1948 births
Living people
20th-century Portuguese male singers
Portuguese songwriters
Male songwriters
Portuguese male writers
21st-century Portuguese male singers
People born at sea